Georgy Gennadyevich Zhukov (born 19 November 1994) is a Kazakh professional footballer who plays as a midfielder for Cangzhou Mighty Lions and the Kazakhstan national team.

Career

Club
On 27 January 2014, Zhukov joined Kazakhstan Premier League side FC Astana on a year-long loan deal.

On 5 December 2016, Zhukov signed a three-year contract with Kazakhstan Premier League side FC Kairat.

Wisła Kraków
On 27 November 2019, Wisła Kraków announced the signing of Zhukov effective as of 1 January 2020.

International
Zhukov was born in Kazakhstan, but emigrated to Belgium as a child and was eligible for both teams. As a youth, he played for the Belgium U19s, but later switched to Kazakhstan. He played for the Kazakh youth teams, before making his debut for the Kazakhstan national football team in a friendly 0-0 tie against the Russia national football team on 31 March 2015.

Career statistics

Club

International

Statistics accurate as of match played 29 March 2022

Honors
Astana
 Kazakhstan Premier League: 2014, 2015
 Kazakhstan Super Cup: 2015

Notes

References

External links

1994 births
Living people
Kazakhstani footballers
Kazakhstan under-21 international footballers
Kazakhstan international footballers
Belgian footballers
Belgium youth international footballers
Belgian people of Kazakhstani descent
Belgian people of Russian descent
Kazakhstani expatriate footballers
Beerschot A.C. players
Standard Liège players
Roda JC Kerkrade players
FC Ural Yekaterinburg players
FC Astana players
Wisła Kraków players
Belgian Pro League players
Eredivisie players
Russian Premier League players
Kazakhstan Premier League players
Ekstraklasa players
Expatriate footballers in the Netherlands
Expatriate footballers in Russia
Expatriate footballers in Poland
Association football midfielders
Sportspeople from Semey